Birthday Boy may refer to:

Film and television 
 Birthday Boy (2004 film), a short animated film by Sejong Park
 Birthday Boy (2022 film), a Panamanian thriller drama film 
 "Birthday Boy" (Squirrel Boy), an episode of Squirrel Boy
 "Birthday Boy" (Without a Trace), an episode of Without a Trace
 "Birthday Boy" is an episode of Whatever Happened to the Likely Lads?

Literature and art 
 "Birthday Boy" (short story), an unpublished short story by J. D. Salinger
 The Birthday Boys, a 1991 novel by Beryl Bainbridge
 Birthday Boy, a 1983 painting by Eric Fischl

Music 
 Birthday Boy (album), a 1995 album by Junkhouse, or the title song
 "Birthday Boy", a song by Drive-By Truckers from The Big To-Do
 "Birthday Boy", a song by Pet Shop Boys from Release
 "Birthday Boy", a song by The Residents from Duck Stab/Buster & Glen
 "Birthday Boy", a song by Robin Trower from Caravan to Midnight
 "Birthday Boy", a song by Ween from GodWeenSatan: The Oneness
 "Birthday Boy (Drama)", a song by Montt Mardié from Clocks/Pretender